Bilaspur may refer to:

Places in India

 Bilaspur, Bihar, a village in Mairwa community development block
 Bilaspur district, Chhattisgarh
 Bilaspur, Chhattisgarh, administrative headquarters of the district
 Bilaspur (Lok Sabha constituency), a parliamentary constituency
 Bilaspur (Chhattisgarh Vidhan Sabha constituency), a legislative assembly constituency
 Bilaspur Junction railway station
 Bilaspur, Haryana, a town in Yamunanagar district, Haryana
 Bilaspur district, Himachal Pradesh
 Bilaspur, Himachal Pradesh, a city and a municipal council in Bilaspur district
 Bilaspur (Himachal Pradesh Assembly constituency), a legislative assembly constituency
 Bilaspur State, one of the princely states of India, also known as Kahlur
 Bilaspur State (1950–54), a state within the Union of India from 1950 to 1956
 Bilaspur, Madhya Pradesh, a village in Umaria district
 Bilaspur, Ganjam, Odisha
 Bilaspur, Rampur, a town in Rampur district, Uttar Pradesh
 Bilaspur, Gautam Buddh Nagar, a village in Gautam Buddh Nagar district, Uttar Pradesh
 Bilaspur, Uttar Pradesh, a town in Muzaffarnagar district, Uttar Pradesh
 Bilaspur (Assembly constituency)
 Bilaspur Road railway station

Other uses
 Bilaspur Airport, located at the village of Chakarbhatta, outside of Bilaspur, Chhattisgarh
 Bilaspur University, Bilaspur, Chhattisgarh
 Bilaspur, a fictional village in Bihar in the 1997 film Mrityudand

See also
 Bilaspuri, Indo-Aryan language spoken in Bilaspur, Himachal Pradesh